Eye of Jupiter may refer to:
"The Eye of Jupiter" (Battlestar Galactica), an episode of Battlestar Galactica
NGC 3242 or Eye of Jupiter Nebula, a nebula 
Great Red Spot of the planet Jupiter